Montcalm Community College (MCC) is a public community college in Sidney, Michigan.  Founded in 1965, Montcalm Community College had an enrollment of 2,080 students in 2005. Steam Locomotive GTW 7456 is on display at this site.

Notable alumni
Brian Calley, Lt. Governor of Michigan.

References

External links
Official website

Two-year colleges in the United States
Community colleges in Michigan
Education in Montcalm County, Michigan
Buildings and structures in Montcalm County, Michigan
Educational institutions established in 1965
1965 establishments in Michigan